Spook–Spoofing is a 1928 Our Gang short silent comedy film directed by Robert F. McGowan. It was the 70th Our Gang short released.

Plot
The gang mercilessly taunt and bully superstitious Farina, who retaliates with a magic charm on one Harry. Harry then plays dead and the gang encourage Farina to bury the “corpse”.

Production notes
At over 31 minutes, Spook-Spoofing is the longest silent Our Gang short produced. It was initially included in the Little Rascals television package, but was later withdrawn for perceived racial insensitivities.

Bobby Dean was originally chosen as a replacement for Joe Cobb, once Joe outgrew his role. Dean died in 1929 due to health issues, appearing in only Our Gang shorts.

Jean Darling does not appear in this film but is featured in promotional photos.

Cast

The Gang
 Joe Cobb as Joe
 Jackie Condon as Jackie
 Allen Hoskins as Farina
 Bobby Hutchins as Wheezer
 Mildred Kornman as Mildred
 Jay R. Smith as Jay, the Undertaker's son
 Harry Spear as Harry
 Bobby Dean as Other fat boy
 Pete the Pup as himself

Additional cast
 Johnny Aber as First boy running
 Charles A. Bachman as Policeman
 Charles Lloyd as Vendor selling the eclipse glasses

See also
 Our Gang filmography

References

External links

1928 films
1928 comedy films
American silent short films
American black-and-white films
Films directed by Robert F. McGowan
Hal Roach Studios short films
Our Gang films
1928 short films
1920s American films
Silent American comedy films
1920s English-language films